3-Quinuclidinyl benzilate (QNB) (IUPAC name 1-azabicyclo[2.2.2]octan-3-yl hydroxy(diphenyl)acetate; US Army code EA-2277; NATO code BZ; Soviet code Substance 78) is an odorless and bitter-tasting military incapacitating agent. BZ is an antagonist of muscarinic acetylcholine receptors whose structure is the ester of benzilic acid with an alcohol derived from quinuclidine.

Physiochemical characteristics
BZ is a white crystalline powder with a bitter taste. It is odorless and nonirritating with delayed symptoms several hours after contact. It is stable in most solvents, with a half-life of three to four weeks in moist air; even heat-producing munitions can disperse it. It is extremely persistent in soil and water and on most surfaces. BZ is soluble in water, soluble in dilute acids, trichloroethylene, dimethylformamide, and most organic solvents, and insoluble with aqueous alkali.

Effects
As a powerful anticholinergic agent, BZ produces a syndrome of effects known as the anticholinergic toxidrome: these include both physical and physiological effects, with the most incapacitating effect being a state of delirium characterized by cognitive dysfunction, hallucinations, and inability to perform basic tasks. The usual syndrome of physical anticholinergic effects are also present, including mydriasis (potentially to the point of temporary blindness), tachycardia, dermal vasodilation, xerostomia and hyperthermia. The readily-observable symptoms of the anticholinergic toxidrome are famously characterized by the mnemonic "Mad as a hatter, red as a beet, dry as a bone and blind as a bat" (and variations thereof).

Toxicity 
Based on data from more than 500 reported cases of accidental atropine overdose and deliberate poisoning, the median lethal oral dose is estimated to be approximately 450 mg (with a shallow probit slope of 1.8). Some estimates of lethality with BZ have been grossly erroneous, and ultimately the safety margin for BZ is inconclusive due to lack of human data at higher dosage ranges, though some researchers have estimated it to be 0.5 to 3.0 mg/kg and an LD01 is 0.2 to 1.4 mg/kg (Rosenblatt, Dacre, Shiotsuka, & Rowlett, 1977).

Treatment 
Antidotes for BZ include 7-MEOTA, which can be administered in tablet or injection form. Atropine and tacrine (THA) have also been used as treatments, THA having been shown to reduce the effects of BZ within minutes. Some military references suggest the use of physostigmine to temporarily increase synaptic acetylcholine concentrations.

History

Invention and research
BZ was invented by the Swiss pharmaceutical company Hoffman-LaRoche in 1951. The company was investigating anti-spasmodic agents, similar to tropine, for treating gastrointestinal ailments when the chemical was discovered. It was then investigated for possible use in ulcer treatment, but was found unsuitable. At this time the United States military investigated it along with a wide range of possible nonlethal, psychoactive and psychotomimetic incapacitating agents including psychedelic drugs such as LSD and THC, dissociative drugs such as ketamine and phencyclidine, potent opioids such as fentanyl, as well as several glycolate anticholinergics. By 1959, the United States Army showed significant interest in deploying it as a chemical warfare agent. It was originally designated "TK", but when it was standardized by the Army in 1961, it received the NATO code name "BZ", the Chemical Corps initially referred to BZ as CS4030, then later as EA 2277. The agent commonly became known as "Buzz" because of this abbreviation and the effects it had on the mental state of the human volunteers intoxicated with it in research studies at Edgewood Arsenal in Maryland. As described in retired Army psychiatrist James Ketchum's autobiographical book Chemical Warfare: Secrets Almost Forgotten (2006), work proceeded in 1964 when a general envisioned a scheme to incapacitate an entire trawler with aerosolized BZ; this effort was dubbed Project DORK. BZ was ultimately weaponized for delivery in the M44 generator cluster and the M43 cluster bomb, until all such stocks were destroyed in 1989 as part of a general downsizing of the US chemical warfare program.

In 2022 a documentary film, Dr Delirium and The Edgewood Experiments, was broadcast on Discovery+, featuring an interview with Ketchum not previously shown.

Use and alleged use

In February 1998, the British Ministry of Defence accused Iraq of having stockpiled large amounts of a glycolate anticholinergic incapacitating agent known as ‘Agent 15’. Agent 15 is an alleged Iraqi incapacitating agent that is likely to be chemically identical to BZ or closely related to it. Agent 15 was reportedly stockpiled in large quantities prior to and during the Persian Gulf War. However, after the war the CIA concluded that Iraq had not stockpiled or weaponized Agent 15.

According to Konstantin Anokhin, professor at the Institute of Normal Physiology in Moscow, BZ was the chemical agent used to incapacitate terrorists during the 2002 Nord-Ost siege, but at least 115 hostages perished due to overdose; but many other agents have also been proposed, and none definitively confirmed.

In January 2013, an unidentified U.S. administration official, referring to an undisclosed U.S. State Department cable, claimed that "Syrian contacts made a compelling case that Agent 15, a hallucinogenic chemical similar to BZ, was used in Homs". However, in response to these reports a U.S. National Security Council spokesman stated,
"The reporting we have seen from media sources regarding alleged chemical weapons incidents in Syria has not been consistent with what we believe to be true about the Syrian chemical weapons program".

Legality 
BZ is listed as a Schedule 2 compound by the OPCW (Szinicz, 2005).

See also
 Edgewood Arsenal human experiments
 EA-3167
 EA-3443
 EA-3580
 EA-3834

Footnotes

References

External links
 Erowid—BZ Vault
 eMedicine—3-Quinuclidinyl Benzilate Poisoning
 Possible Abuse of BZ by Insurgents in Iraq
 Center for Disease Control—BZ Incapacitating Agent
 Paradise Lost: The Psycho Agents by Reid Kirby
 Department of Defense—Agent BZ use in Hawaii April through June 1966

Muscarinic antagonists
Carboxylate esters
Deliriants
Incapacitating agents
3-Quinuclidinyl esters
Chemical weapons of the United States
Swiss inventions
Tertiary alcohols
Benzilate esters